Diploderma zhaoermii is a species of lizard in the family Agamidae. The species is endemic to Sichuan, China.

Etymology
The specific name, zhaoermii, is in honor of Chinese herpetologist Zhao Er-mi.

Geographic range
D. zhaoermii is found in western Sichaun province, China.

Habitat

Taxonomy
D. zhaoermii was first collected in 1933, but not described until 2002.

Reproduction
D. zhaoermii is oviparous.

References

Further reading
Manthey U (2010). Agamid Lizards of Southern Asia, Draconinae 2, Leiolepidinae. Frankfurt am Main: Chimaira. 168 pp. .
Wang K, Che J, Lin S-M, Deepak V, Aniruddha D-R, Jiang K, Jin J, Chen H, Siler CD (2018). "Multilocus phylogeny and revised classification for mountain dragons of the genus Japalura s. l. (Reptilia:Agamidae: Draconinae) from Asia". Zoological Journal of the Linnean Society 185 (1): 246–267. (Diploderma zhaoermii, new combination).

Diploderma
Lizards of Asia
Reptiles of China
Endemic fauna of Sichuan
Reptiles described in 2002